Luse is a surname. Notable people with the surname include:

Claude Luse (1879–1932), American lawyer and judge
Louis K. Luse (1854–1920), American lawyer and politician
Tom Luse, American film producer

English-language surnames